Buyaso is one of five parishes in Illano, a municipality within the province and autonomous community of Asturias, in northern Spain. 

The population is 136.

Villages
 A Baboreira
 Bustello
 Buyaso
 Llanteiro
 Llombatín
 El Poceiro
 El Villar de Buyaso

Hamlets 
 El Cortín
 A Chousaveya
 A Penella

References

Parishes in Illano